Saratoga Springs Public Library (SSPL), established in 1950, is a public library located in Saratoga Springs in the Capital District area of New York. SSPL serves the Saratoga Springs City School District.

Services and facilities
The three-story building on Henry Street that now houses the library was opened in 1995. SSPL offers a wide variety of services in the building and via the web site. The library offers a collection of current, high demand print and non-print items, including books on tape or compact discs, DVDs, as well as access to online electronic information resources, downloadable audio books, ebooks and videos, and much more. The library provides public computer access and is Wi-Fi accessible. The Library offers free programs and activities for all ages.
  
Librarians are available to respond to the information needs of customers who walk-in or phone-in with questions. SSPL also provides Ask-A-Librarian (https://www.sspl.org/contact/librarian/), an email reference service.

The library offers wireless capability, a coffee shop, and The Friends Book Shop bookstore selling used paperback and hardbound books.

The Saratoga Room is a collection of local history resources containing books, pamphlets, audio-visual materials on the Saratoga Springs area.  Examples are a history of the effort to preserve the springs, The Politics of Hydrotherapy and the Development of a New York State Policy written by local resident and former Saratoga Spa State Park employee Ed Murphy,  and the "Frank Sullivan Collection" of books written by humorist Frank Sullivan or inscribed to him by his famous friends. This room is open for limited hours.

The library is part of the Southern Adirondack Library System, providing an integrated online catalog and interlibrary loan among thirty-six libraries in Saratoga, Warren, Washington, and Hamilton counties.

History

The first library in Saratoga Springs, the Saratoga Athenaeum, was a private subscription library founded in 1885 by a group that included Spencer Trask and Joseph Drexel among others.  This library was first located on the corner of Broadway and Caroline Street, and moved to 344 Broadway in 1906.

In 1945 voters approved a proposal to construct a public library, which opened at 320 Broadway at the intersection of, Spring Street in a corner of Congress Park, in 1950.  When this library opened students from the Saratoga Springs school district carried the books down Broadway to their new home. 

The library's current building at 49 Henry Street broke ground in 1993 and opened in 1995.  It was designed by Architecture Plus of Troy, New York and The LA Group and Phillips Associates of Saratoga Springs.

References

External links

 Saratoga Springs Public Library website

Public libraries in New York (state)
Buildings and structures in Saratoga Springs, New York
Education in Saratoga County, New York
Library buildings completed in 1995